Luiz Inácio Lula da Silva and Geraldo Alckmin were inaugurated as 39th President of Brazil and 26th Vice President of Brazil, respectively, on 1 January 2023, in a ceremony held in the National Congress in Brasília, beginning the third Lula administration. At the age of 77, Lula became the oldest president-elect to assume office and the only president in Brazilian history to serve two non-consecutive terms in office through the democratic vote.

Background 
On 2 October, the day of the first round of voting in the 2022 general election, Lula placed first with 48.43% of the valid votes, with which he qualified for a runoff against incumbent Jair Bolsonaro, who garnered 43.20% of the valid votes. Lula was elected in the second round on 30 October, making him Brazil's first three-term president and the first since Getúlio Vargas to be elected for a non-consecutive term. He was inaugurated on 1 January 2023. In break with tradition, outgoing president Jair Bolsonaro did not attend his successor's inauguration and instead left Brazil for the U.S. state of Florida two days before the ceremony.

Inaugural events 

The presidential inauguration ceremony took place in and outside the National Congress building. The president-elect and the vice-president-elect paraded in a Rolls-Royce Silver Wraith from the Brasília Cathedral to the National Congress building, where the presidential swearing-in oath took place during the joint congressional session. The Brazilian Senate TV channel as well as major Brazilian TV channels such as TV Globo, Bandeirantes and SBT broadcast the inauguration ceremony.

The session was opened by Senate President Rodrigo Pacheco, who declared a moment of silence for Pelé and Pope Benedict XVI, both of whom had died in the week prior. After the playing of the National anthem of Brazil, Lula and Alckmin took their respective oaths of office, after which First Secretary of the Chamber of Deputies Luciano Bivar read out the official record of the election and oaths of office. The record was signed by Lula, Alckmin, Pacheco, Bivar, Chamber Speaker Arthur Lira, Supreme Federal Court President Rosa Weber and Attorney General Augusto Aras. Lula made a speech to accept his inauguration, and Pacheco subsequently spoke to affirm the commitment of Congress to working with the executive branch on key issues, after which he closed the session.

Guests in attendance at the joint session included former presidents José Sarney and Dilma Rousseff, Supreme Electoral Court President Alexandre de Moraes, Superior Court of Justice President Maria Thereza de Assis Moura, and Superior Labor Court President Lélio Bentes Corrêa.

After the joint session, Lula, Alckmin and their spouses were paraded to the Palácio do Planalto, where they were joined at the ramp by several individuals selected from among Lula's voters by the presidential transition committee to represent the diversity of Brazil:

 Chief Raoni Metuktire, an indigenous leader and an activist for conservation of the Amazon 
 Aline Sousa, a 33-year-old garbage collector and member of the National Movement of Waste Pickers (MNCR)
 Francisco Carlos do Nascimento e Silva, a 10-year-old swimmer from the outskirts of São Paulo 
 Ivan Baron, a social media personality and a social justice activist from Rio Grande do Norte 
 Murilo de Quadros Jesus, a teacher from Curitiba 
 Jucimara Fausto dos Santos, a cook for the Association of Employees of the State University of Maringá and a member of the Free Lula movement
 Wesley Viesba Rodrigues Rocha, a metallurgist
 Flávio Pereira, an artisan and a member of the Free Lula movement
As Bolsonaro was not in attendance, the presidential sash was handed among the aforementioned and placed on Lula's shoulder by Sousa. Lula, Alckmin and their spouses then walked to the podium of the palace where Lula spoke to the nation. After the speech, the four then walked inside the building again to receive foreign state delegations. Afterward, Lula publicly signed executive orders rescinding several executive orders from the Bolsonaro administration, including re-establishing gun control, restoring the Bolsa Família program, creating an exclusive cabinet for matters involving indigenous and minority affairs, combatting de-forestation in the Amazon and illegal mining, restoring the Amazon Fund and civil society participation in the National Environment Council (Conama).

Foreign attendance 

Lula's third inauguration was attended by the largest number of foreign leaders at a presidential inauguration in Brazil's history, beating the current record held by Lula himself in his first inauguration as president back in 2003. Lula's third inauguration was also attended by more foreign leaders, heads of State and heads of Government than the Rio Olympic Games in 2016.

The following foreign ministers or higher-ranking officials attended Lula's inauguration:
 : People's National Assembly President Ibrahim Boughali
 : President João Lourenço
 : President Alberto Fernández
 : First Deputy Prime Minister Yaqub Eyyubov
 : President Luis Arce
 : Foreign Minister Lejeune Mbella Mbella
 : President José Maria Neves
 : President Gabriel Boric
 : Vice President Wang Qishan
 : President Gustavo Petro
 : Foreign Minister Arnoldo André Tinoco
 : Vice President Salvador Valdés Mesa
 : President of the Chamber of Deputies Alfredo Pacheco
 : President Guillermo Lasso
 : Senate President Teresa Efua Asangono
 : Vice President Félix Ulloa
 : Minister Delegate in charge of Foreign Trade Olivier Becht
 : Foreign Minister Michael Moussa Adamo
 : President Frank-Walter Steinmeier
 : Foreign Minister Mario Búcaro 
 : President Mamady Doumbouya
 : President Umaro Sissoco Embaló
 : President Irfaan Ali
 : Foreign Minister Jean Victor Généus
 : President Xiomara Castro
 : President of the Islamic Consultative Assembly Mohammad Bagher Ghalibaf
 : Senate President Tom Tavares-Finson
 : House of Representatives member Yūko Obuchi
 : Republic of Kenya Chief Minister (Prime Cabinet Secretary) Musalia Mudavadi
 : Deputy Prime Minister Nthomeng Majara
 : Chief of government Abdoulaye Maïga
 : Foreign Secretary Marcelo Ebrard and First Lady Beatriz Gutiérrez Müller
 : Prime Minister Aziz Akhannouch
 : Assembly of the Republic President Esperança Bias
 : Foreign Minister Denis Moncada
 : Foreign Minister Riyad al-Maliki
 : Vice President José Gabriel Carrizo
 : President Mario Abdo Benítez
 : Prime Minister Alberto Otárola
 : President Marcelo Rebelo de Sousa
 : President of the Federation Council Valentina Matvienko
 : Prime Minister Ralph Gonsalves
 : Foreign Minister Faisal bin Farhan Al Saud
 : President of National Assembly Vladimir Orlić
 : Minister in the Prime Minister's Office Maliki Osman
 : King Felipe VI, Second Deputy Prime Minister Yolanda Díaz and Minister of Foreign Affairs José Manuel Albares
 : Foreign Minister Naledi Pandor
 : Leader of the ruling People Power Party Chung Jin-suk
 : President Chan Santokhi
 : President José Ramos-Horta
 : President Faure Gnassingbé
 : Foreign Minister Mevlüt Çavuşoğlu
 : Deputy Prime Minister Yulia Svyrydenko 
 : Secretary of State for Environment, Food and Rural Affairs Thérèse Coffey
 : Secretary of Interior Deb Haaland
 : President Luis Lacalle Pou
 : National Assembly President Jorge Rodríguez
 : President Emmerson Mnangagwa

International organizations officials 
In addition to government representatives, the following senior international organizations officials also attended Lula's third inauguration as president:
 Amazon Cooperation Treaty Organization (ACTO) – Secretary-general Maria Jacqueline Mendoza Ortega
 Inter-American Development Bank (IDB) – President Ilan Goldfajn
 Latin American Integration Association (ALADI) – Secretary-general Alejandro de la Peña
  Community of Portuguese Language Countries – Executive Secretary Zacarias da Costa

Planning

Security 
The inauguration had more reinforced security than previous inaugurations, with approximately 700 federal police, a bomb squad, plainclothes agents and equipment that neutralize the drone signal and prevent overflights in the event area.

Pre and post-inaugural events 

The Festival do Futuro (Festival of Future) cultural festival was held in the same location of the Three Powers Plaza from 10:00 Brasília Time (UTC−03:00) on 1 January until the official inaugural events opened (around 13:00). It resumed at 15:30 on the same day when the transfer of power officially ended, and concluded on the next day morning at 04:00. The festival events which included several concerts, an art exhibition featuring Brazilian culture artworks in the National Museum of the Republic and a gastronomy festival displaying the Brazilian cuisine were attended by approximately 300,000 people.

See also 
 First inauguration of Luiz Inácio Lula da Silva
 Second inauguration of Luiz Inácio Lula da Silva

References

External links
First Lula speech after victory in the 2022 presidential election

2023 in Brazilian politics
January 2023 events in Brazil
Lula
Ceremonies in Brazil
Luiz Inácio Lula da Silva